The Mohawk M-2-C Chieftain is a prototype light twin aircraft from the Mohawk Aircraft Company.

Design
The M-2-C is a low-wing three place twin engine aircraft with conventional landing gear powered by two Michigan Rover engines.

Operational history
X-590E was registered on March 30, 1929 and sold several times in rapid succession while remaining registered in Minneapolis. The Mohawk Aircraft company was dissolved in 1930.

Specifications (M-2-C)

References

1930s United States civil aircraft
1930s United States experimental aircraft
Low-wing aircraft
Twin-engined tractor aircraft
Aircraft first flown in 1929